is a railway station in the town of Takanezawa, Tochigi, Japan, operated by the East Japan Railway Company (JR East).

Lines

Station layout
The station consists of one side platform serving a single track. There is no station building. The station is unattended.

History
The station opened on 15 August 1934.

Surrounding area
Sugamata Hospital

See also
 List of railway stations in Japan

References

External links

 JR East Station information 

Railway stations in Tochigi Prefecture
Railway stations in Japan opened in 1934
Karasuyama Line
Takanezawa, Tochigi
Stations of East Japan Railway Company